Rolf Bull-Hansen (29 February 18888 October 1970) was a Norwegian educator and author.

Biography
He was born at Norderhov in Buskerud, Norway.  He was a son of headmaster and parish priest Fredrik Vilhelm Bull Hansen (1852-1923) and Caroline Steenbuch (1862-1939). He was an uncle of army general Fredrik Bull-Hansen. He attended Bergen Cathedral School and  graduated in 1908 with a teacher's degree from the University of Kristiania (now University of Oslo).

From 1938 he was headmaster and later rector of the Norwegian National Academy of Craft and Art Industry in Notodden until his retirement in 1954.
He is known for his contributions to drawing education with a focus on first developing creativity and spontaneity  followed later by technique and methodology. He was decorated Knight, First Class of the Order of St. Olav in 1948.

References

Related reading
Kjetil Fallan (2016) Designing Modern Norway: A History of Design Discourse (Taylor & Francis) 

1888 births
1970 deaths
People from Ringerike (municipality)
People educated at the Bergen Cathedral School
University of Oslo alumni
Norwegian educators
Heads of schools in Norway
Recipients of the St. Olav's Medal